Altenhof may refer to:

 Altenhof, Mecklenburg-Vorpommern, a German municipality in the Mecklenburgische Seenplatte district
 Altenhof, Schleswig-Holstein, a German municipality in the Rendsburg-Eckernförde district
 Altenhof, a German village within the Schorfheide municipality in Brandenburg
 Altenhof, German name for the village of Stary Dwór, Lubusz Voivodeship, Poland
 Schloss Altenhof, a castle in Pfarrkirchen im Mühlkreis, Austria